Neolentinus lepideus is a basidiomycete mushroom of the genus Neolentinus, until recently also widely known as Lentinus lepideus. Common names for it include scaly sawgill, scaly lentinus and train wrecker.

Appearance
Neolentinus lepideus fruit bodies are tough, fleshy, agarics of variable size. The cap is at first convex and flattens with maturity while the margin remains enrolled. The cap may grow up to about 12 cm, while the stem grows to about 8 cm in height. The white, cream to pale-brown cap cuticle is distinctively covered with concentrically arranged dark scales which become denser towards the depressed cap centre. The gills are white and their attachment to the stem is adnate to subdecurrent or decurrent. The gills and stipe can become dark reddish with age. The white stem is covered in dark scales in the region below the white ring. The odor is somewhat like anise, and the taste is indiscernible.

The spore mass is white and the spores are cylindrical in shape. The spore dimensions are 8–12.5 by 3.5–5 µm.

Habitat and distribution
The fruiting bodies of Neolentinus lepideus are found singly or in tufts emerging from dead and decaying coniferous wood, favouring pines (Pinus) including old stumps, logs, and timber. It may also be found in gardens, on man-made wooden structures such as old railroad ties, and in such unusual places as coal mines. Less frequently, it is also found on non-coniferous hardwood. The fungus's fruiting season is spring to autumn and it is common in Europe and North America. There have also been multiple reports of its occurrence in the Western Cape, South Africa.

Importance
Neolentinus lepideus has a saprotrophic mode of nutrition and is an important woodland decomposer and a cause of wet rot in building materials. The fungus has shown tolerance of wood treated with creosote and other preservatives, and has been used in experiments to evaluate the efficacy of treatment methods.

Edibility
Some authors qualify Neolentinus lepideus as edible, although it requires cooking to soften it up. Despite there being no recorded poisonings, because fruitbodies of it tend to grow on human-made wooden structures, the fungus may come in contact with hazardous chemicals, like wooden railroad ties smeared with creosote.
Fruiting bodies have a flesh with a tough consistency which increases with maturity.

Similar species
Neolentinus ponderosus is similar but has no partial veil, and thus no ring.

References

External links
Rogers Mushrooms species description
Good quality images

Wood-decay fungi
Gloeophyllales
Fungi of Europe
Fungi of North America
Fungi described in 1985